Gujarat Legislative Assembly or Gujarat Vidhan Sabha is the unicameral legislature of the Indian state of Gujarat, in the state capital Gandhinagar. Presently, 182 members of the Legislative Assembly are directly elected from single-member constituencies (seats). It has a term of 5 years unless it is dissolved sooner. 13 constituencies are reserved for scheduled castes and 27 constituencies for scheduled tribes.  From its majority party group or by way of a grand coalition cabinet of its prominent members, the state's Executive namely the Government of Gujarat is formed.

History
BJP has broken the record of winning most seats in Gujarat assembly which was previously with Madhav Singh Solanki who has won 149 seats. BJP has been in power since 1995. BJP is also near the record of being longest serving party in an assembly consecutively. Currently the record is with Left alliance which had been in power for 34 years (from 1977 to 2011).

Government Formation
After gained super majority in 2022 Gujarat Legislative Assembly election BJP has elected Bhupendrabhai Patel as leader of legislative party on 10 December 2022. On 12 December Bhupendrabhai Patel has been taken oath by Governor Acharya Devavrat. Also 8 leaders has taken oath as Cabinet ministers, 2 as Minister of State with Independent Charges and 6 other as Minister of State.

On next day 3 Independent candidatea has decided to support BJP Government.

Notable Position

Party wise distribution

Members of Legislative Assembly

See also 
 2022 Gujarat Legislative Assembly election
 14th Gujarat Assembly
 Government of Gujarat

References 

Gujarat Legislative Assembly
Politics of Gujarat